Jean-Jacques Bridey (born 7 May 1953) is a French politician representing La République En Marche!, formerly a member of the Socialist Party. He was elected to the French National Assembly on 18 June 2017, representing the department of Val-de-Marne.

See also
 2017 French legislative election

References

1953 births
Living people
Deputies of the 14th National Assembly of the French Fifth Republic
Deputies of the 15th National Assembly of the French Fifth Republic
La République En Marche! politicians
People from Nice
Socialist Party (France) politicians